Wilbert Ira Pritchett (February 10, 1897 – August 5, 1955), also known as "Wilbur", was an American Negro league pitcher between 1924 and 1932.

A native of Ridgely, Maryland, Pritchett made his Negro leagues debut in 1924 with the Hilldale Club. He went on to play for the Harrisburg Giants, Baltimore Black Sox, and Philadelphia Tigers before returning to Hilldale in 1929 and 1930. Pritchett finished his career with a short stint with the Newark Browns in 1932. He died in Philadelphia, Pennsylvania in 1955 at age 58.

References

External links
 and Baseball-Reference Black Baseball stats and  Seamheads

1897 births
1955 deaths
Baltimore Black Sox players
Harrisburg Giants players
Hilldale Club players
Newark Browns players
Philadelphia Tigers players
20th-century African-American sportspeople
Baseball pitchers